is a Shinto shrine located in the city of Kakegawa, Shizuoka Prefecture, Japan. It is one of two shrines claiming the title of ichinomiya of former Tōtōmi Province, the other being the Oguni Jinja in the town of Mori    The shrine's main festival is held annually three days prior to Respect for the Aged Day in September.

Enshrined kami
However, as the one of the shrine implies, the main focus of the shrine is on the Hachiman trinity, which at this shrine are identified as Empress Jingū, Emperor Ōjin and Tamayori-hime.

History
The foundation date of this shrine is unknown. The shrine's legend states that it was established by the Mononobe clan, who were the Kuni no miyatsuko during the reign of the legendary Emperor Seimu (131-190 AD), but nothing is known of its history prior to its appearance in the Engishiki  records in the early Heian period. The shrine also claims that it was originally located on Mount Hongu to the north of the present site, and was relocated in 807 by Sakanoue no Tamuramaro. It has been referred to as the ichinomiya of Tōtōmi Province since the early Kamakura period. As the shrine of located near Nissaka-shuku on the Tōkaidō highway near the location of the feared Nakayama Pass, one of the three major obstacles on the Tōkaidō, travelers would make prayers and offerings at this shrine. This is mentioned many times in literature, from Sei Shōnagon's The Pillow Book, the Azuma Kagami of the Kamakura period and the Jippensha Ikku's Tōkaidōchū Hizakurige of the Edo Period. It was restored by Tokugawa Ieyasu in 1603, who gave it estates worth 100 koku for its upkeep. Following the Meiji Restoration, it was given the rank Prefectural shrine under the Modern system of ranked Shinto Shrines. The ancient name of "Kotonomama" was only revived after the end of World War II.

Gallery

See also
List of Shinto shrines
Ichinomiya

References

External links

Official website
Kakegawa City home page

Shinto shrines in Shizuoka Prefecture
Ichinomiya
Tōtōmi Province
Kakegawa, Shizuoka
Hachiman shrines